Shepherds' Crusade may refer to:
Shepherds' Crusade (1251)
Crusade of the Poor (1309), also called the Shepherds' Crusade
Shepherds' Crusade (1320)